Hugh Arnold van Zwanenberg (5 November 1916 – 1 September 1984) was a British sprint canoeist who competed in the late 1940s. At the 1948 Summer Olympics in London, he finished seventh, together with Mike Symons, in the C-2 1000 m event. He was born in Fulham, London, and he died in Wargrave.

References
Sports-reference.com profile

1916 births
1984 deaths
English male canoeists
Canoeists at the 1948 Summer Olympics
Olympic canoeists of Great Britain
People from Fulham
British male canoeists